Sergeant Dev Raj Singh Thakur, KC (died May 1987), was a sergeant working in Indian Air Force. He received national prominence for chasing and apprehending Nathuram Godse.

He was awarded the Kirti Chakra, a gallantry award, in 1952 for arresting Godse by Dr Rajendra Prasad contemporaneous President of India and he was promoted to the rank of Warrant Officer. He is in news posthumously, for his family demanding a government job for a kin of gallantry award winner as there is no breadwinner in the family.

Personal details

He had three sons and one daughter. While in service in the Indian Air Force, he lost his mental balance and was subsequently sent on retirement. He remained in a mental health facility for 14 years in Amritsar. 
The causes of his loss of mental balance are not known, but it is possibly due to his act of apprehending Nathuram Godse. Godse was the person who killed Mohandas Gandhi.He received a monthly pension from the Indian government until he died in May 1987.

Awards
 Ashok Chakra Award (Class II) in 1952.

References

External links
 Poverty stalks Godse grabber's family, Hindustan Times article copied at UCAN India.
 64 years on, family of man who caught Gandhi’s killer in penury 
 Dev Raj ThakurZee News

1987 deaths
Recipients of the Ashoka Chakra (military decoration)
Military personnel from Himachal Pradesh
Indian Air Force personnel
Year of birth missing
Recipients of the Kirti Chakra
 Kirti Chakra